The 22nd Utah Senate District is located in Central Davis County and includes Utah House Districts 11, 15, 16, 17 and 18. The district includes Farmington, Kaysville, Fruit Heights, most of Layton and part of North Centerville. The current State Senator representing the 22nd district is Stuart Adams.

Previous Utah State Senators (District 22)

Election results

2006 General Election

See also
 Gregory S. Bell
 Utah Democratic Party
 Utah Republican Party
 Utah Senate

External links
 Utah Senate District Profiles
 Official Biography of Gregory S. Bell

22
Davis County, Utah